is a Japanese singer and idol signed to YU-M Entertainment. She was a first generation member and the leader of Angerme as well as the leader of Hello! Project.

Biography
Wada joined Hello! Project as a member of Hello! Pro Egg in June 2004. Wada continued her training and appeared at numerous Hello! Project group concerts as a backing dancer, including the Country Musume concert Country Musume Live 2006: Shibuya des Date. In November 2007, Wada received a part in the musical Reverse! Watashi no karada doko desu ka?.

In 2008, Wada was chosen as one of the four members of the new Hello! Pro Egg unit Shugo Chara Egg! alongside Yuuka Maeda, Kanon Fukuda, and Akari Saho.

On 4 April 2009, Wada was selected to debut in the Hello! Project group S/mileage along with Yuuka Maeda, Kanon Fukuda, and Saki Ogawa and was named the leader of the group. S/mileage members, including Wada, then left Hello! Pro Egg and Shugo Chara Egg! to focus on their new group activities.

In July 2010, Wada joined the Hello! Project revival unit ZYX-α. In 2011, Wada, along with Yuuka Maeda and Kanon Fukuda, was chosen to voice act in the anime Hime Chen! Otogi Chikku Idol Lilpri. Together, the trio formed the unit Lilpri and sang the opening and ending themes for the anime as well as the insert songs. In 2012, Wada joined the Hello! Project and SATOYAMA movement unit Peaberry alongside Riho Sayashi.

On 17 December 2014, S/mileage changed their group name to Angerme with Wada remaining as the leader. On 1 January 2017, Wada succeeded Maimi Yajima as the leader of Hello! Project.

On 5 April 2018, it was announced that Wada would graduate from Angerme and Hello! Project at the end of the group's spring tour in 2019. Her graduation was held on 18 June 2019 at Nippon Budokan. As a member of Hello! Project for almost 15 years, she had the second longest tenure after Momoko Tsugunaga, who beat her by one day.

On 1 August 2019, the day of her 25th birthday, Wada started her solo activities and opened an official website as well as social media accounts and a YouTube channel.

Hello! Project groups and units
 Hello! Pro Egg (2004–2010)
 Shugo Chara Egg! (2008–2009)
 S/mileage•Angerme (2009–2019)
 ZYX-α (2009)
 Lilpri (2010–2011)
 Hello! Project Mobekimasu (2011)
 Peaberry (2012–2016)

Discography

Filmography

References

External links
 Official website
 Official blog
 

Angerme members
Japanese idols
Japanese women pop singers
Japanese voice actresses
Japanese television personalities
Voice actresses from Gunma Prefecture
Living people
1994 births
Musicians from Gunma Prefecture